Plustek Inc. is a computer hardware company established in 1986 that manufactures image scanners, as well as surveillance devices in recent years. They have the MobileOffice, SmartOffice, OpticBook, OpticPro, OpticFilm, and OpticSlim line of products.

Competitors 
 Canon
 Epson
 Fujitsu
 HP
 KeyScan
 Lexmark
 Microtek
 Mustek Systems
 Ricoh
 Xerox
 Umax
 Avision Inc

See also
 List of companies of Taiwan

References

External links 
 

Companies based in Taipei
Computer peripheral companies
Electronics companies of Taiwan
Taiwanese brands
Taiwanese companies established in 1986